The meridian 78° east of Greenwich is a line of longitude that extends from the North Pole across the Arctic Ocean, Asia, the Indian Ocean, the Southern Ocean, and Antarctica to the South Pole.

The 78th meridian east forms a great circle with the 102nd meridian west.

From Pole to Pole
Starting at the North Pole and heading south to the South Pole, the 78th meridian east passes through:

{| class="wikitable plainrowheaders"
! scope="col" width="120" | Co-ordinates
! scope="col" | Country, territory or sea
! scope="col" | Notes
|-
| style="background:#b0e0e6;" | 
! scope="row" style="background:#b0e0e6;" | Arctic Ocean
| style="background:#b0e0e6;" |
|-
| style="background:#b0e0e6;" | 
! scope="row" style="background:#b0e0e6;" | Kara Sea
| style="background:#b0e0e6;" | Passing just east of Vize Island, Krasnoyarsk Krai, 
|-valign="top"
| 
! scope="row" | 
| Yamalo-Nenets Autonomous Okrug — Oleniy Island and Gydan Peninsula
|-
| style="background:#b0e0e6;" | 
! scope="row" style="background:#b0e0e6;" | Yuratski Bay
| style="background:#b0e0e6;" |
|-
| 
! scope="row" | 
| Yamalo-Nenets Autonomous Okrug — Gydan Peninsula
|-
| style="background:#b0e0e6;" | 
! scope="row" style="background:#b0e0e6;" | Khalmyer Bay
| style="background:#b0e0e6;" |
|-
| 
! scope="row" | 
| Yamalo-Nenets Autonomous Okrug — Gydan Peninsula
|-
| style="background:#b0e0e6;" | 
! scope="row" style="background:#b0e0e6;" | Taz Estuary
| style="background:#b0e0e6;" |
|-
| 
! scope="row" | 
| Yamalo-Nenets Autonomous Okrug — Gydan Peninsula
|-
| style="background:#b0e0e6;" | 
! scope="row" style="background:#b0e0e6;" | Taz Estuary
| style="background:#b0e0e6;" |
|-valign="top"
| 
! scope="row" | 
| Yamalo-Nenets Autonomous Okrug Khanty-Mansi Autonomous Okrug — from  Tomsk Oblast — from  Novosibirsk Oblast — from  Altai Krai — from 
|-
| 
! scope="row" | 
| Pavlodar Region
East Kazakhstan Region 

Almaty Region passing through Lake Balkhash
|-
| 
! scope="row" | 
| Issyk-Kul Region passing through Issyk Kul lake
|-valign="top"
| 
! scope="row" | 
| Xinjiang
|-valign="top"
| 
! scope="row" | Aksai Chin
|-valign="top"
| 
! scope="row" | 
|-
| style="background:#b0e0e6;" | 
! scope="row" style="background:#b0e0e6;" | Indian Ocean
| style="background:#b0e0e6;" |
|-
| style="background:#b0e0e6;" | 
! scope="row" style="background:#b0e0e6;" | Southern Ocean
| style="background:#b0e0e6;" |
|-
| 
! scope="row" | Antarctica
| Australian Antarctic Territory, claimed by 
|-
|}

See also
77th meridian east
79th meridian east

e078 meridian east